Beginnings is the debut album by the Australian music group Memento. The album was released on 25 February 2003 through Columbia Records. The singles "Nothing Sacred" and "Saviour" both had music videos and achieved moderate success on the US mainstream rock chart. The track "Nothing Sacred" appeared in the EA Sports video game NASCAR Thunder 2004.

Track listing
 "Nothing Sacred" – 4:24
 "Saviour" – 3:27
 "Beginnings" – 5:09
 "Shell" – 4:29
 "Abyss" – 4:42
 "Below" – 4:35
 "Reflections" – 1:51
 "Blister" – 6:08
 "Coming" – 2:58
 "Stare" – 4:14
 "Figure 8" – 12:50

References

2003 debut albums
Columbia Records albums
Memento (band) albums
Albums produced by Toby Wright